Roy B. Robertson (September 9, 1919 – March 1, 2000) was an American football coach and college athletics administrator. He served as the head football coach at Nebraska Wesleyan University in Lincoln, Nebraska from 1950 to 1953 and Colorado College in Colorado Springs, Colorado from 1954 to 1956, compiling a career college football coaching record of 20–44–4.

Robertson letters in football, basketball, track at from McPherson College in McPherson, Kansas before graduating in 1940.

Head coaching record

College

References

External links
 

1919 births
2000 deaths
American football ends
Colorado College Tigers football coaches
McPherson Bulldogs football players
McPherson Bulldogs men's basketball players
Nebraska Wesleyan Prairie Wolves athletic directors
Nebraska Wesleyan Prairie Wolves football coaches
College men's track and field athletes in the United States
High school football coaches in Missouri
People from Reno County, Kansas
Players of American football from Kansas
Basketball players from Kansas
Track and field athletes from Kansas